Bayley Liu (born 3 August 1996) is a Scotland international rugby league footballer who plays as a  or  forward for the Sheffield Eagles in the Betfred Championship.

He previously played for the West Wales Raiders in Betfred League 1 and the Dewsbury Rams in the Championship.

Background
Liu was born in Christchurch, New Zealand. He is of Māori(Tainui, Waikato)Samoan and Scottish descent.

Playing career

Club career
Liu played for the Central Queensland Capras in the Queensland Cup.

He played for the West Wales Raiders in their 2020 season.

Liu joined the Dewsbury Rams ahead of the 2021 season.

He joined Sheffield ahead of the 2022 season.

International career
In 2022 Liu was named in the Scotland squad for the 2021 Rugby League World Cup.

References

External links
Sheffield Eagles profile
Scotland profile
Scotland RL profile

1996 births
Living people
Rugby league centres
Rugby league players from Christchurch
Sheffield Eagles players
Dewsbury Rams players
Scotland national rugby league team players
South Wales Scorpions players
New Zealand rugby league players
New Zealand people of Scottish descent